in B-flat major, Op. 20, is a romantic piano piece by Robert Schumann, composed in 1839 and dedicated to Julie von Webenau. Schumann cited Jean Paul's style of humour as source of inspiration, although there are no direct programmatic links to Jean Paul's oeuvre found in the piece.

Structure

The Humoreske consists of seven sections (not originally indicated as such by the composer except for the last one, ""), to be played attacca after each other. Although the piece is nominally written in B-flat major, most of the piece is set in B-flat major's relative minor key, G minor. The musical texture and emotional tone, though, varies widely and differs greatly between the sections:
 "" (Simple) (B major, M. M.  = 80)
"" (Very fast and light) (B major, 2/4, M. M.  = 138)
"" (Even faster) (G minor)
"",  (First tempo, as in the beginning) (B major)
 "" (Hastily) (G minor, 2/4, M. M.  = 126)
"" (Gradually more lively and stronger) (D minor)
"" (As previously) Adagio 
 "" (Simple and delicate) (G minor, M. M.  = 100)
"Intermezzo" (B major, 2/4, M. M.  = 100)
 "" (Heartfelt) (B major, M. M.  = 116)
"" (Quicker) (Tempo I)
 "" (Very lively) (G-minor/B major, 2/4, M. M.  = 76)
"" (Increasingly lively) Stretto
 "" (With some pomp) (modulating, M. M.  = 92)
 "" (To the resolution) (B major, M. M.  = 112 ) Allegro

A typical performance is about 27 minutes long. It is less popular with audiences than with pianists, and Robert Cummings wrote that some musicologists view it as an ill-judged attempt by Schumann to “take his formula in Kreisleriana a step further.” However, it has been championed by critics such as Judith Chernaik and John C. Tibbetts (who consider Humoreske among Schumann's greatest pieces) as well as Anthony Tommasini, who referred to it as one of Schumann’s “most astonishing, and most overlooked, piano works”.

Sources
 Robert Schumann: Sämtliche Klavierwerke, vol. IV, Breitkopf & Härtel, Wiesbaden 1988, pp. 1–29.

References

External links
 
, Piano soloist: Alicia de Larrocha
 Piano Soloist: Piotr Anderszewski

Piano music by Robert Schumann
Music dedicated to family or friends
Compositions for solo piano
1839 compositions
Compositions in B-flat major